Alaka Sahani (born 1974) is an Indian film critic and Senior Assistant Editor with the Indian Express, Mumbai, and heads its Features section. She received the Swarna Kamal as the best film critic at the 61st National Film Awards 2014. Alaka studied in different parts of Odisha. She did her schooling at Barabati Girls High School, Baleswar, FM College, Baleswar and SB Women's College, Cuttack. Alaka is a graduate from the Indian Institute of Mass Communication, Dhenkanal, Odisha. Here are some of the links to Alaka's National Award-winning stories.

References

External links
Orissadiary.com
Indiantelevision.com
Newindianexpress.com
Odishasuntimesd.com
Ibnlive.in.com
 http://archive.indianexpress.com/news/a-river-called-ritwik/1129439/
 http://archive.indianexpress.com/news/what-s-playing-at-edward-theatre-/1123757/
 Articles at The Indian Express

Living people
Indian film critics
1974 births
Indian Express Limited people
Indian women critics
Best Critic National Film Award winners